Lakewood is an unincorporated community in Havana Township, Mason County, Illinois, United States.

References

Unincorporated communities in Mason County, Illinois
Unincorporated communities in Illinois